The Gulon is a creature in Scandinavian legend, also known as a "Jerff" in Northern Sweden and "Vielfraß" in Germany. It resembles a hodgepodge of various animals, usually described as being the size and shape of a dog, with some cat-like features such as the head, ears, and claws. It also supposedly has a thick coat of shaggy brown fur and a tail resembling that of a fox.

The Gulon is notorious as a symbol of gluttony because of the strange eating habits it is supposed to have. It will make a kill and then gorge itself until it is swollen and unable to eat more, at which point it will find two trees and squeeze itself in between them, pushing the meat through its own body before returning to the kill and repeating the process.

It is probably a Wolverine based on the traits it shares with the animal native to arctic climates around the world, including Scandinavia. 

Resource: Historia de gentibus septentrionalibus by Olaus Magnus. (The History of the Northern People, 1555 AD)

References 
The Mythical Creatures Bible: The Definitive Guide to Legendary Beings -  Gulon
Encyclopedia of Beasts and Monsters in Myth, Legend and Folklore -  Gulon

Scandinavian legendary creatures
Scandinavian folklore
Germanic legendary creatures